Globipes is a genus of harvestmen in the family Sclerosomatidae from North America.

Species
 Globipes rugosus Schenkel, 1951
 Globipes schultzei Roewer, 1932
 Globipes simplex (Schenkel, 1951)
 Globipes spinulatus Banks, 1893

References

Harvestmen
Harvestman genera